Erwin Stütz (born 8 August 1936) is a Swiss racewalker. He competed in the men's 50 kilometres walk at the 1964 Summer Olympics and the 1968 Summer Olympics.

References

1936 births
Living people
Athletes (track and field) at the 1964 Summer Olympics
Athletes (track and field) at the 1968 Summer Olympics
Swiss male racewalkers
Olympic athletes of Switzerland
Place of birth missing (living people)